The 1994 Sta. Lucia Realtors season was the second season of the franchise in the Philippine Basketball Association (PBA).

Draft picks

Notable dates
March 6: The Sta.Lucia Realtors pulled off a 111-108 victory over Tondeña 65 in the opening game of the league's 20th season.  

March 22: The Realtors scored their fourth win against San Miguel and handed the beermen their first loss in four games in a 103-93 victory as Jun Limpot scored 35 points.  

March 26: In the out-of-town game in Sta.Cruz, Laguna, the Realtors scored their fifth victory in six starts as they repeated over Tondeña 65 Rhum Masters, 110-105.

Roster

Transactions

Trades

Additions

Recruited imports

References

Sta. Lucia Realtors
Sta. Lucia Realtors seasons